"Kormia Hamena" is a song by Greek singer Katy Garbi. It was released on digital platforms on 15 September 2019 by Panik Platinum, a sub-label of Panik Records, as the second single from her upcoming twenty-first studio album.

"Kormia Hamena" will be one of five new tracks written and produced by Phoebus to feature on the upcoming album, while the remaining five will be new duets of previously recorded songs by Garbi, written by Phoebus.

A music video of the single directed by George Gavalos premiered on 8 November 2019.

Credits and personnel
Credits adapted from YouTube.

 Katy Garbi – lead vocals and backing vocals
 Phoebus – executive production, orchestration, programming, drums, percussion
 Giorgos Hatzopoulos – Guitars (electric, acoustic, 12-string)
 Stavros Papagiannakopoulos – Dobra, Tziran, Tar, Bouzouki
 Giorgos Roilos – percussion
 Akis Deiximos – backing vocals
 Akis Deiximos, Savvas Galanis, Haris Galanis, Fotis Papazisis, Christina Ralli, Chrysa Bandelis, Angelina Koutsourakis – vocals
 Vassilis Nikolopoulos – mixing
 Vangelis Siapatis – sound engineering, computer editing
 Paul Stefanidis – mastering

Release history

Charts
"Kormia Hamena" debuted on the Cyprus Top 20 Combined Airplay Chart at number 15 upon its release, peaking at number 7 and remaining in the Top 20 for five weeks. The single debuted on the Top 20 Greek Official IFPI Airplay Chart at number 20, remaining in the Top 20 for 29 weeks, peaking at number 5. It entered the Top 20 Combined Official IFPI Airplay Chart at number 16, remaining in the Top 20 for 23 weeks, peaking at number 8.

Weekly charts

Year-end charts

References

Katy Garbi songs
2019 songs
Songs written by Phoebus (songwriter)